Tsuda (written: 津田) is a Japanese surname. Notable people with the surname include:

, Japanese photographer
, Japanese politician
Daisuke Tsuda (disambiguation), multiple people
, Japanese basketball coach
, Japanese philosopher and aikidoka
, Japanese actor
, Japanese footballer
, Japanese voice actor and actor
, Japanese freestyle skier
, Japanese statesman and legal scholar
, Japanese manga artist
, Japanese manga artist
, Japanese voice actress
, Japanese samurai
, Japanese police officer and failed assassin
, Japanese long-distance runner
, Japanese politician, educator and writer
, Japanese actress and voice actress
, Japanese tea master
, Japanese footballer
, Japanese motorcycle racer
, Japanese footballer
, Japanese baseball player
, Japanese educator, founder of Tsuda University
, Japanese politician
, Japanese photographer
Yukio Tsuda (disambiguation), multiple people

Japanese-language surnames